The Cameron Files: Secret at Loch Ness (known as Loch Ness in Europe) is an adventure video game released in 2001-2002, developed by Galiléa and published by Wanadoo Edition and DreamCatcher Interactive. It was followed in 2002 by a sequel, The Cameron Files: Pharaoh's Curse.

Story
The detective Alan Parker Cameron is investigating the secret case of the monster of Loch Ness, he is sent to “Devil's Ridge Manor” (A mansion located at the shore of the lake) because people claim to see ghosts and paranormal activity around the house. Alan is sent there to resolve this weird case.

Gameplay
As the detective you must explore this haunted house, full of labyrinths and traps. You will also have to visit the depths of the lake in order to complete the game.

Reception

The game received "average" reviews according to video game review aggregator Metacritic.

Sequels
The Cameron Files series continued, and another game was released for the PC in 2002: The Cameron Files: Pharaoh's Curse. In 2013, the software developer Microids made a mobile version of "Secret at Loch Ness" for the iPhone, iPad, and iPod Touch, optimized for the iPhone 5. When asked if there would be a Pharaoh's Curse mobile version, there was no response from Microids.

See also
Necronomicon: The Dawning of Darkness
The Mystery of the Druids

References

External links
 The Cameron Files: Secret at Loch Ness at Microïds
 

2001 video games
Windows games
Windows-only games
Microïds games
Adventure games
Detective video games
Fiction set in 1932
Fiction set in 1933
Video games set in Scotland
The Adventure Company games
DreamCatcher Interactive games
The Cameron Files
Video games developed in France